The 2010 Kenyan Premier League was the seventh season of the Kenyan Premier League since it started in 2003 and the forty-seventh season of top division football in Kenya since 1963. It began on 20 February with Mahakama and Sony Sugar and ended on 14 November with Nairobi City Stars and Gor Mahia.

Sofapaka had previously won the title but Ulinzi Stars finished top. Sofapaka still won the 2010 Kenyan Super Cup after defeating 12-time champions A.F.C. Leopards.

After staying in the league for an entire decade, Red Berets, who were only two points behind KCB when they were relegated along with previously promoted Mahakama, disbanded to immense pressure from its sponsors to produce good performances. The two teams had replaced Bandari and Agrochemical, the former gaining promotion once again for the next season.

Changes from last season
Relegated from Premier League
 Agrochemical
 Bandari

Promoted from Nationwide League
 Mahakama
 Posta Rangers

Teams

Stadia and locations

League table

Results

See also
 2010 Kenyan Super Cup

Notes

Kenya
Kenyan
Kenya
Kenyan
1
2010